Kharbav is a railway station on the Vasai Road–Diva–Panvel–Roha route of the Central Line, of the Mumbai Suburban Railway network. Bhiwandi is the previous stop and Kaman Road is the next stop. It is a developing town and one of the primary railway stations in Paygaon. Around 12 trains pass through Kharbao railway station. Kharbao railway station code is (KHBV).

Facilities 
The Kharbao Railway Station is well connected through the city and has parking facilities available as well. Other facilities you can find near this railway station are ATM machines, information kiosks and internet cafes.

The most popular trains passing through the Kharbao railway station are BSR DIVA DMU, BSR PNVL Memu, PNVL BSR Memu and DI BSR DMU.

References

Railway stations in Thane district
Mumbai Suburban Railway stations
Mumbai CR railway division